The Continental Cup 1998–99 was the second edition of the IIHF Continental Cup. The season started on September 18, 1998, and finished on December 29, 1998.

The tournament was won by HC Ambrì-Piotta, who won the final group.

Preliminary round

Group A
(Lyon, France)

Group A standings

Group B
(Jaca, Spain)

Group B standings

Group C
(Novi Sad, Yugoslavia)

Group C standings

Group D
(Nowy Targ, Poland)

Group D standings

Group E
(Bucharest, Romania)

Group E standings

Group F
(Miercurea Ciuc, Romania)

Group F standings

First Group Stage

Group G
(Amiens, France)

Group G standings

Group H
(Poprad, Slovakia)

Group H standings

Group J
(Novopolotsk, Belarus)

Group J standings

Group K
(Cardiff, United Kingdom)

Group K standings

Group L
(Oświęcim, Poland)

Group L standings

Group M
(Omsk, Russia)

Group M standings

 Düsseldorfer EG,
 HC Liberec,
 EHC Graz
 HC Ambrì-Piotta,
 Torpedo Yaroslavl,
 HK Neman Grodno     :  bye

Second Group Stage

Group N
(Düsseldorf, Germany)

Group N standings

Group O
(Ambri, Switzerland)

Group O standings

Group P
(Yaroslavl, Russia)

Group P standings

 HC Košice    :  bye

Final Group Stage
(Košice, Slovakia)

Final Group standings

References
 Continental Cup 1999

1998–99 in European ice hockey
IIHF Continental Cup